Germyl, trihydridogermanate(1-), trihydrogermanide, trihydridogermyl or according to IUPAC Red Book: germanide is an anion containing germanium bounded with three hydrogens, with formula . Germyl is the IUPAC term for the – group. For less electropositive elements the bond can be considered covalent rather than ionic as "germanide" indicates. Germanide is the base for germane when it loses a proton.

The first germyl compound to be discovered was sodium germyl. Germane was reacted with sodium dissolved in liquid ammonia to produce sodium germyl. Other alkali metal germyl compounds are known. There are also numerous transition metal complexes that contain germyl as a ligand.

Formation 
Alkali metal germyl compounds have been made by reacting germane with the alkali metal dissolved in liquid ammonia, or other non-reactive solvent.

Salt elimination can be used in a reaction with monochlorogermane and a sodium salt of a transition metal anion:
.

In the gas phase, the germyl anion  can be made from germane by capturing an electron with more than 8 eV of energy:

The germyl radical can be produced and immobilised in molecular form by exposing germane to vacuum ultraviolet light in a solid argon matrix. On heating, digermane is formed:

Properties 
Germyl compounds react with water, so water cannot be used as a solvent. Liquids that have been used as solvents include liquid ammonia, ethyl amine, diglyme, or hexamethylphosphoramide. The choice of solvent depends on the temperature desired, whether alkali metals are going to be dissolved, whether the solvent needs to be distilled, and also if it reacts with the solute.

The bond between the metal ion and the germyl ion may be purely ionic, but may also be bonded via two bridging hydrogen atoms.

The energy to rip a hydrogen atom off germane to make the neutral radical is 82.0±2 kcal/mol. GeH4 → GeH3• + H•. Electron affinity for the radical is 1.6 eV: GeH3• + e− → GeH3−.

Both the anion  and radical  have C3v symmetry, and are shaped as a triangular pyramid with germanium at the top, and three hydrogen atoms at the bottom. In the radical, the H-Ge-H angle is 110°. In the anion the H-Ge-H angle is about 93°.

Reactions 
Germyl compounds gradually decompose at room temperature by releasing hydrogen and forming a metal germide.

Germyl compounds react with alkyl halides to substitute the germyl − group for the halogen. With aromatic halide compounds, dihalomethanes, or neopentyl haldes they replace the halogen with hydrogen. Organogermanium compounds that can be produced include methyl germane, dimethyl germane, digermyl methane, digermyl ethane, digermyl propane.

The germyl ion reacts with water to yield germane:

Sodium germyl reacts with oxygen to form an orthogermanate:

This loses water at room temperature.

K[η5-C5H5)Mn(CO)2GeH3] reacts with acid to yield [η5-C5H5)Mn(CO)2]2Ge which has a Mn=Ge=Mn linkage in it.

List

Related 
Germylidyne with formula ≡GeH has a triple bond to the metal atom.

Germylidene with base formula = has a double bond to the central metal.

References 

Germanium(II) compounds
Metal hydrides
Anions